Joplin Furniture Company Building is a historic commercial building located at Joplin, Jasper County, Missouri.  The two original buildings were constructed in 1899 and 1906, and subsequently expanded and combined in 1908 and 1923.  The resulting building is a four-story bearing wall brick masonry building in the Classical Revival style. The Joplin Furniture Company operated continuously at this location from 1908 to 1982.

It was listed on the National Register of Historic Places in 2012.

References

Commercial buildings on the National Register of Historic Places in Missouri
Neoclassical architecture in Missouri
Commercial buildings completed in 1923
Buildings and structures in Joplin, Missouri
National Register of Historic Places in Jasper County, Missouri